Black Pipe Creek is a stream in the U.S. state of South Dakota.

Black Pipe Creek received its name from the fact Indians obtained black shale from the area in order to make their pipes.

See also
List of rivers of South Dakota

References

Rivers of Bennett County, South Dakota
Rivers of Jackson County, South Dakota
Rivers of Mellette County, South Dakota
Rivers of Todd County, South Dakota
Rivers of South Dakota